Eye Gravel Pit is a  geological Site of Special Scientific Interest in Eye Green in Cambridgeshire. It is a Geological Conservation Review site, and part of it overlaps Eye Green Local Nature Reserve.

This former gravel quarry in the East Anglian Fens has marine and a few non-marine shells laid down when the area was under the North Sea, probably during the warm Eemian period, 130,000 to 115,000 years ago. It is described by Natural England as important because it lies at the junction between fluvial and glacial deposits.

The site is private land with no public access.

References

Sites of Special Scientific Interest in Cambridgeshire
Geological Conservation Review sites